The National Balloon Museum is a non-profit museum in Indianola, Iowa. It was founded in 1975 in short term locations, later gaining a permanent location in 1988. All of the museum's exhibits are about hot air ballooning and gas ballooning. The museum is in the shape of a hot air balloon's gondola. There are only two balloon museums within the United States, the other one being the Anderson-Abruzzo Albuquerque International Balloon Museum.

History
The National Hot Air Balloon Championship preliminaries were held in Indianola in 1970. Due to the success of the competition, the championships started happening every year which led to exhibits being created yearly for the competition. However, the exhibits could only be put up temporarily. The short term exhibits created a need for a museum where they can be stored year round. The exhibits are from the Balloon Federation of America, covering over 200 years of history. Included in the museum's collection is the first hot air balloon that crossed the English Channel. Located within the museum is the U.S. Ballooning Hall of Fame, a children's area and a library. The children's area has photo shoots and books about ballooning.

All of the museum's workers are volunteers. 24,000 people visit the museum each year, with the visitors coming from twenty countries. The museum has hosted a nine day long festival, titled the National Balloon Classic, yearly in late July since 1989. A large donation was received to continue the museum's operation in 2015. The donation was left in a will and was in a large unspecified amount.

References

External links
Official website
Indianola: Ballooning Capital of Iowa

Indianola, Iowa
Museums in Warren County, Iowa
Museums established in 1975
1975 establishments in Iowa
Ballooning museums
Aerospace museums in Iowa
Balloons (aeronautics)